Hippopodiidae is a family of cnidarians belonging to the order Siphonophorae.

Genera:
 Hippopodius Quoy & Gaimard, 1827 
 Vogtia Kölliker, 1853

References

 
Calycophorae
Cnidarian families